Acacia platycarpa, commonly known as the pindan wattle or ghost wattle, is a species of plant in the legume family that is native to northern Australia from Western Australia through the Northern Territory to Queensland.

Description
It grows as a shrub or tree, 1.5–10 m in height, with rough or fissured bark. It produces cream to yellow flowers from December to June.

Distribution and habitat
It occurs on red sand soils in pindan, and on dunes, hills and rocky outcrops. In Western Australia it is found in the Central Kimberley, Dampierland, Great Sandy Desert, Little Sandy Desert, Northern Kimberley, Ord Victoria Plain, Tanami and Victoria Bonaparte IBRA bioregions.

See also
 List of Acacia species

References

platycarpa
Acacias of Western Australia
Fabales of Australia
Plants described in 1859
Flora of the Northern Territory
Flora of Queensland
Taxa named by Ferdinand von Mueller